The 1999–2000 Fresno State Bulldogs men's basketball team represented California State University, Fresno during the 1999–2000 NCAA Division I men's basketball season. This was head coach Jerry Tarkanian's fifth season at Fresno State. The Bulldogs played their home games at Selland Arena and were members of the Western Athletic Conference. They finished the season 24–10, 11–3 in WAC play to finish in second place. They defeated No. 14 Tulsa to win the WAC tournament and earn the conference's automatic bid to the NCAA tournament. The Bulldogs lost in the first round to eventual Final Four participant Wisconsin.

Roster

Schedule and results
Source

|-
!colspan=9 style=| Non-conference regular season

|-
!colspan=9 style=| WAC regular season

|-
!colspan=9 style=| WAC tournament

|-
!colspan=9 style=| NCAA tournament

Awards and honors
Courtney Alexander – WAC Player of the Year

References

Fresno State
Fresno State Bulldogs men's basketball seasons
Fresno State Bulldogs men's bask
Fresno State Bulldogs men's bask
Fresno State